Anthony Benn could refer to: 

Anthony Benn (Recorder of London) ( 1568–1618), English barrister
Anthony Benn (cricketer) (1912–2008), British cricketer and army officer
Tony Benn (1925–2014), British politician and writer

See also
Anthony Benin (born 1950), Ghanaian judge